Meadow Grove Farm is a historic farm complex and national historic district located at Amissville, Rappahannock County, Virginia. It encompasses 13 contributing buildings and 5 contributing sites.  The main house was constructed in four distinct building phases from about 1820 to 1965.  The oldest section is a 1 1/2-story log structure, with a two-story Greek Revival style main block added about 1860. A two-story brick addition, built in 1965, replaced a two-story wing added in 1881.  In addition to the main house the remaining contributing resources include a tenant house/slave quarters, a schoolhouse, a summer kitchen, a meat house, a machine shed, a blacksmith shop, a barn, a chicken coop, a chicken house, two granaries, and a corn crib; a cemetery, an icehouse ruin, two former sites of the present schoolhouse, and the original site of the log granary.

It was added to the National Register of Historic Places in 2006.

References

Farms on the National Register of Historic Places in Virginia
Historic districts on the National Register of Historic Places in Virginia
Greek Revival houses in Virginia
Houses completed in 1860
Houses in Rappahannock County, Virginia
National Register of Historic Places in Rappahannock County, Virginia
Slave cabins and quarters in the United States